The General William C. Westmoreland Bridge connects the city of North Charleston with the West Ashley area of Charleston in South Carolina.  Composed of twin spans, it carries two lanes of Interstate 526 in each direction across the Ashley River and the surrounding marshes.  It is often referred to as simply the "Westmoreland Bridge".

The highway was named for General William C. Westmoreland, a South Carolina native and graduate of West Point.  He is perhaps best known for being a commander of US forces during the Vietnam War.

References
 1995-1996 Bill 918 Accessed August 12, 2010
 National Bridge Index, Accessed August 12, 2010

Westmoreland
Bridges in North Charleston, South Carolina
Road bridges in South Carolina
Interstate 26
Bridges on the Interstate Highway System
Girder bridges in the United States
Bridges completed in 1980